Gundlachia lucasi is a species of minute freshwater snail or limpet, an aquatic pulmonate gastropod mollusk or micromollusk in the family Planorbidae.

Shell description
Shell obliquely conical, thin, semitransparent, horn-colour, covered by a blackish coating. Apex inclined to the right, situated at the posterior third of the length; convex anteriorly, slightly concave on the posterior slope; a few concentric lines of growth. Aperture oval; peritreme sharp, extremely fragile.

The shell length is up to 4 mm, the width up to 2.75 mm, and height up to 1.5 mm.

Anatomy
These animals have a pallial lung, as do all pulmonate snails, but they also have a false gill or "pseudobranch".  This serves as a gill as, in their non-tidal habitat, these limpets never reach the surface for air.

Distribution
This freshwater limpet is endemic to the North Island of New Zealand.

Habitat
These tiny limpets are found attached to stems and undersides of leaves of aquatic plants in quiet waters.

References
This article incorporates public domain text from reference.

Planorbidae
Gastropods described in 1905